The 2013 Chattanooga Mocs football team represented the University of Tennessee at Chattanooga in the 2013 NCAA Division I FCS football season as a member of the Southern Conference (SoCon). The Mocs were led by fifth-year head coach Russ Huesman and played their home games at Finley Stadium in Chattanooga, Tennessee. They finished the season 8–4 overall and 6–2 in SoCon play to share the conference championship with Samford and Furman. Chattanooga not receive the conference's automatic bid to the FCS playoffs and did not receive an at-large bid.

Schedule

References

Chattanooga
Chattanooga Mocs football seasons
Southern Conference football champion seasons
Chattanooga Mocs football